Windsloe Mansion is a text adventure published by Adventure of the Month Club for the Apple II, Atari 8-bit family, and TRS-80. It was the January 1982 Adventure of the Month.

Contents
Windsloe Mansion is a text adventure in which the player needs to rescue the Pumpkin Man from the haunted house where he is being held captive.

Reception
Bruce Campbell reviewed Windsloe Mansion in The Space Gamer No. 61. Campbell commented that "Windsloe Mansion is a loser."

References

1980s horror video games
1982 video games
Adventure games
Apple II games
Atari 8-bit family games
TRS-80 games
Video games developed in the United States